Guignicourt-sur-Vence is a commune in the Ardennes department in northern France.

Population

Sights
Arboretum de Guignicourt-sur-Vence
Guignicourt castle, belonging to the princely family of Merode.

See also
Communes of the Ardennes department

References

Communes of Ardennes (department)
Ardennes communes articles needing translation from French Wikipedia